Keith LeBlanc is an American drummer and record producer, and is a member of the bands Little Axe and Tackhead.

His record "No Sell Out" was one of the first sample-based releases. The song was a success, charting at No. 60 on the UK Singles Chart, and becoming the single of the week for several major music publications. His career started out on Sugar Hill Records recording with hip hop pioneers Grandmaster Flash and Melle Mel, and released several singles on and was a studio musician for Tommy Boy Records.  He is also featured on several tracks on the album Pretty Hate Machine by Nine Inch Nails. He now has his own record label on which he still releases music, samples records, and experiments.

Early life 
LeBlanc grew up in Bristol, Connecticut.  He got his start playing drums after seeing Ringo Starr from the Beatles on TV.  After showing an early interest and focus, his parents bought him a practice pad, and he joined the orchestra in school.  A drummer in school encouraged his early interest, inspiring him to cobble together a makeshift kit which he played along to records on his father's HiFi system. He did his first show at 14, after having been snuck into the club by his bandmates who were older.

Sugar Hill Records 
LeBlanc's friend Harold Sargent, the drummer for the house band at Sugar Hill Records was retiring, and needed to find his replacement. He brought in LeBlanc, who auditioned for Doug Wimbush and Skip McDonald who agreed to take him on after hitting it off with LeBlanc.  After replacing Sargent, LeBlanc worked as the session drummer for Sugar Hill Records for four years.

Discography

Solo albums 
 Major Malfunction (1986, World)
 Stranger Than Fiction (1989, Enigma)
 Invisible Spike (1991, Blanc)
 Raw (1990, Blanc)
 Time Traveller (1992, Blanc)
 Freakatorium (1999, Blanc)
 Stop the Confusion (Global Interference) (2005, Collision: Cause of Chapter 3)

Tackhead

References

External links
Official website
Unofficial discography
On NME
Sunday Mercury
On Drumdrops
Keith LeBlanc Interview NAMM Oral History Library (2021)

Year of birth missing (living people)
Living people
Tommy Boy Records artists
American drummers
Tackhead members
Fats Comet members